Mareena Robinson Snowden is the first Black woman to earn a Ph.D. in nuclear engineering from the Massachusetts Institute of Technology.

Education 
Snowden attended Florida A&M University and the Massachusetts Institute of Technology where she earned a Ph.D. in nuclear engineering.

Career 
Snowden worked as a National Nuclear Security Administration Graduate Fellow in the Office of Nuclear Energy at the US Department of Energy before serving as a Stanton Nuclear Security Fellow at the Carnegie Endowment for International Peace.

References 

Year of birth missing (living people)
Living people
Florida A&M University alumni
Massachusetts Institute of Technology alumni
Women nuclear physicists